Arnoldo Lavagnino "Kiko" Castro (11 January 1939 – 16 December 2013) was a Mexican baseball player who is in the Mexican Baseball Hall of Fame. He played from 1958 to 1983 for the Chihuahua Dorados (1958), Aguascalientes Tigres (1960–1961), Mexico City Red Devils (1960), Mexico City Tigers (1962–1970, 1977–1978, 1980), Sabinas Piratas (1971–1973), Coahuila Mineros (1974–1976) and Veracruz Aguila (1983). He managed the Tabasco Plataneros for the latter part of the 1980 season, replacing Raul Cano, and in 1983 he skippered the Chihuahua Dorados. He was elected to the Mexican Professional Baseball Hall of Fame in 1995.

He was born and died in Guasave, Sinaloa, Mexico.

References

External links

1939 births
2013 deaths
People from Guasave
Minor league baseball players
Baseball players from Sinaloa
Diablos Rojos del México players
Mexican Baseball Hall of Fame inductees